Josef Hrubeš (born September 26, 1916, date of death unknown) was a Czechoslovak boxer who competed in the 1936 Summer Olympics for Czechoslovakia. He was born in Slaný. In 1936 he was eliminated in the quarter-finals of the middleweight class after losing his fight to the upcoming gold medalist Jean Despeaux.

External links
Josef Hrubeš' profile at Sports Reference.com
Josef Hrubeš' profile at Boxrec.com

1916 births
Year of death missing
People from Slaný
Czechoslovak male boxers
Middleweight boxers
Olympic boxers of Czechoslovakia
Boxers at the 1936 Summer Olympics
Czech male boxers
Sportspeople from the Central Bohemian Region